Aegires incisus is a species of sea slug, a nudibranch, a marine, opisthobranch gastropod mollusk in the family Aegiridae.

Distribution
This species was described from Norway. It is redescribed by Fahey & Gosliner, (2004).

References

Aegiridae
Gastropods described in 1872